Andy Paulin (born November 29, 1958) is an American former cyclist. He competed in the team time trial at the 1988 Summer Olympics.

His ex-wife is cyclist Katrin Tobin who he met when Tobin was a member of the American national team.

References

External links
 

1958 births
Living people
American male cyclists
Olympic cyclists of the United States
Cyclists at the 1988 Summer Olympics
Sportspeople from Palo Alto, California
Pan American Games medalists in cycling
Pan American Games gold medalists for the United States
Cyclists at the 1987 Pan American Games